The Party of Pensioners, Disabled and Restitution (Montenegrin: Партија пензионера, инвалида и реституције / Partija penzionera, invalida i restitucije), also known by its initial name Party of United Pensioners and the Disabled (Montenegrin: Partija ujedinjenih penzionera i invalida, PUPI) is a minor single-issue politics party, representing the interests of pensioners in Montenegro.

History
Party was founded in 2009. In 2009 parliamentary election PUPI ran independently and won 2.4% of the votes, just below the 3% electoral threshold.  At the 2012 parliamentary election the party participated within a left-wing "Together" coalition, along with Yugoslav Communist Party of Montenegro, which won only 0,38% of votes. Shortly after the election the party joined the coalition with the populist Democratic Front alliance, which it leaves after the 2016 election, at which the party again failed to win a parliamentary status.

In July 2020, PUPI decided to enter the big tent Peace is Our Nation (initially the Citizens' Bloc) coalition with Democratic Montenegro, DEMOS and the New Left in order to participate at the forthcoming August 2020 parliamentary election.

Parliamentary elections

References

Political parties in Montenegro
Pensioners' parties